The Albanian national futsal team represents Albania in international futsal competitions and is controlled by the Albanian Football Association. The team debuted in the 2005 UEFA Futsal Championship qualifiers. They won the first match 8–6 against England, and then they drew to Cyprus, but failed to qualify because of goal difference. In the 2007 UEFA Futsal Championship qualifiers, Albania made a bad performance by losing all of its matches and finishing last in its group. In the 2008 FIFA Futsal World Cup qualifiers, Albania was drawn against Slovenia, Greece, and Malta. They ended up in second place winning two matches and losing only one. In the end, Slovenia topped the group and advanced to the two-legged play-offs.

Competition History

FIFA Futsal World Cup

Notes

UEFA Futsal Championship

Notes

Fixtures and results

2020

Players

Current squad
The following players were called up for the UEFA Futsal Euro 2022 qualifying.All caps and goals as of 1 February 2020 after match against , only competitive matches are included.

Notes

References

External links
 Federata Shqiptarë Futbollit

European national futsal teams
Football in Albania
Futsal in Albania
Futsal
2003 establishments in Albania